Fahraj Rural District may refer to:
 Fahraj Rural District (Kerman Province)
 Fahraj Rural District (Yazd County), Yazd province